Bats in the Belfry is a 1942 American animated short film directed by Rudolf Ising and Jerry Brewer for MGM and released to theaters on July 4, 1942. The short tells the story of three singing, crazy bats in a belfry.

Plot
A trio of belfry-dwelling bats explain, musically, (and demonstrate) why they are associated with nuttiness.

References

External links
 

1942 films
1942 animated films
1942 short films
Metro-Goldwyn-Mayer animated short films
Films directed by Rudolf Ising
Films about bats
1940s American animated films
1940s animated short films
Films scored by Scott Bradley
Films produced by Fred Quimby
1940s English-language films